Japan Bible Seminary (Japanese:聖書宣教会) is an evangelical Christian seminary located in Hamura, Tokyo.

The seminary was founded in 1958 in Suginami, Tokyo by Junichi Funiki and Akira Hatori. It moved to Hamura, Tokyo in 1989.

Notable faculty
 Yoshiyuki Muchiki—the principal and Old Testament scholar
 David Toshio Tsumura—Old Testament scholar and research professor of Old Testament

Notable alumni
 Sueo Oshima—A scholar of Karl Barth
 Kazuhiko Uchida—noted Christian author and pastor and former dean of Japan Bible Seminary
 Yoshiyuki Muchiki—Old Testament scholar and the principal of Japan Bible Seminary.
 Yoshinobu Endo—He was a noted Christian author and Old Testament.

External links
Japan Bible Seminary web site
Dale and Ann Little Web Site

Evangelical seminaries and theological colleges
Educational institutions established in 1958
1958 establishments in Japan
Seminaries and theological colleges in Japan